James Donaldson & Sons is a British family-owned timber merchant.

History 
The firm was founded in 1860.

In 2020, the sixth generation of the Donaldson family took over operation of the firm. In January 2021, the firm launched Buzz Home Office, a business providing made-to-measure home office furniture. In June 2021, the firm acquired Kitchens International. In December 2021, the firm acquired Stewart Milne Timber Systems, a subsidiary of the Stewart Milne Group.

Operations 
The firm is based in Glenrothes, Fife. It currently has 31 locations around the UK. Former locations include a sawmill in Wemyss, the land for which was sold to Sainsbury's in the late 1990s.

Subsidiaries 

 Buzz Home Office
 Donaldson Timber Engineering
 MGM Timber

References 

1860 establishments in Scotland
Companies based in Fife